Crime(s) against nature may refer to:

 Crime against nature, a form of sexual behavior that is not considered natural and is seen as a punishable offense in some jurisdictions
 "Crimes Against Nature", the title of a letter by Robert F. Kennedy Jr. published in the December 11, 2003 issue of Rolling Stone magazine
 Crimes Against Nature (book), a political book by Robert F. Kennedy, Jr.

See also
 Law of nature (disambiguation)
 Natural law (disambiguation)